Olszyniec  is a village in the administrative district of Gmina Żary, within Żary County, Lubusz Voivodeship, in western Poland.

The village has a population of 350.

References

Olszyniec